Rossy Noprihanis (born 28 November 1990) is an Indonesian professional footballer who plays as a right winger or attacking midfielder for Liga 2 club Sulut United.

Club career

Persepam Madura Utama
He scored a hat-trick against Persiba Balikpapan on July 7, 2013.

PSIM Yogyakarta
In 2019, Noprihanis signed a contract with Indonesian Liga 2 club PSIM Yogyakarta. He made 16 league appearances and scored 2 goals for PSIM Yogyakarta.

Sulut United
He was signed for Sulut United to play in Liga 2 in the 2020 season. This season was suspended on 27 March 2020 due to the COVID-19 pandemic. The season was abandoned and was declared void on 20 January 2021.

Honours

Club
Pelita Jaya U-21
 Indonesia Super League U-21 runner-up: 2009-10
PSS Sleman
 Liga 2: 2018

References

External links 
 
 Rossy Noprihanis at Liga Indonesia

1990 births
Living people
Sportspeople from West Nusa Tenggara
Indonesian footballers
KSB West Sumbawa players
Persepam Madura Utama players
Madura United F.C. players
PSS Sleman players
Persiba Balikpapan players
PSIM Yogyakarta players
Indonesian Premier Division players
Liga 1 (Indonesia) players
Liga 2 (Indonesia) players
Association football midfielders